Frank Eikenburg (July 7, 1944 – June 4, 2009) was an American politician who served in the Texas House of Representatives from 1981 to 1985.

He died of liver cancer on June 4, 2009, in Dallas, Texas at age 64.

References

1944 births
2009 deaths
Republican Party members of the Texas House of Representatives
20th-century American politicians